The OM639 is a turbocharged inline-three diesel engine produced by Mercedes-Benz, in collaboration with Mitsubishi Motors.

Design 
The OM639 is based on the four-cylinder OM640 engine and features a dual mass flywheel, exhaust gas recirculation, and Euro 4 emission standard compliance. It is transversely mounted behind the front axle and inclined 60 degrees due to the sandwich floor design used in the Smart and Mitsubishi models, so the engine slides underneath the floorpan instead of into the cabin in the event of a head-on collision to improve safety.

Models

OM639 DE15 LA R 
 2004–2006 Smart Forfour 1.5l CDI
 2004–2009 Mitsubishi Colt 1.5 DI-D

OM639 DE15 LA 
 2004–2006 Smart Forfour 1.5l CDI
 2004–2009 Mitsubishi Colt 1.5 DI-D

Reception 
Due to the relatively low sales of the cars the engine was placed in to (compared to the class leaders), the engine is in a niche between owners.

At the time, the 70 kW version was the world's most powerful three-cylinder passenger car diesel engine. Despite this, it was only used in the Smart Forfour (until discontinuation) and the Mitsubishi Colt (until its facelift in 2008, citing lack of demand). Today, the most powerful three-cylinder passenger car diesel engine is the BMW B37, which achieves 116 hp.

The engine is reliable, with no common issues or widespread issues noted by owners, and no recalls issued.

Lastly, real world MPG is very close to Mitsubishi's numbers out on the road, with it getting over 90% of its rated official MPG of 58.9 rated by owners of the vehicles.

References 

OM639
Diesel engines by model
Straight-three engines